Altanulia is an extinct genus of prehistoric amphibian.

Description  
The holotype of Altanulia - PIN 553/300 -, consisting of an isolated 20 mm long maxilla bearing 45-47 teeth, was found by the Soviet-Mongolian Paleontological Expedition in the southern Gobi Desert, Nemegt Formation, and dates from the Upper Cretaceous (Upper Campanian-Lower Maastrichtian). Altanulia was diagnosed on the basis in the "Posterior part of maxilla deep, with longitudinal wedge-shaped labial depression; pterygoid tubercle of maxilla well expressed; frontal process in anterior part of bone."

Classification 
Altanulia belongs to the Discoglossidae, due to the shape and structure of the lingual surface of its maxilla.

See also
 Prehistoric amphibian
 List of prehistoric amphibians

References

Cretaceous frogs
Fossil taxa described in 1993